Sydney Front was an Australian performance group formed in 1986 particularly known for integrating the audience into their productions. They combining elements of performance art and experimental theatre in their work. In 1999 John McCallum, theatre critic in The Australian newspaper wrote,'The Sydney Front is still Australia's most influential contemporary performance company, although they disbanded in 1993.

The core of the group were performers John Baylis, Andrea Eloise, Clare Grant, Nigel Kellaway and Chris Ryan. Kellaway had been the first Australian to train with Japanese director Tadashi Suzuki. Premiering many of their works at the Performance Space, Sydney, they toured the UK, Europe and Hong Kong.

Their work The Pornography of Performance became a cause célèbre when it was performed at London's Riverside Studios. Along with the work of the Wooster Group and Forced Entertainment, Sydney Front were cited as Anglophonic examples of postdramatic theatre in the English edition of Hans-Thies Lehmann's Postdramatic Theatre, 2006. The group briefly reformed in 2004 to perform at the 21st birthday event for the Performance Space in Sydney.

A two DVD set and streaming program, Staging the Audience: The Sydney Front documenting The Sydney Front's work was released by Artfilms in 2012.

Major works
Waltz, 70 minute theatre work, Sydney, 1987.
John Laws/Sade, 80 minute theatre work, Sydney, 1987.
The Pornography of Performance, 100 minute performance work, Adelaide, Sydney, 1988; Denmark, Amsterdam, Salzburg, Düsseldorf, London, 1989.
The Burnt Wedding, 60 minute street performance, Brisbane, 1988; Sydney & European tour, 1989.
Photocopies of God, 60 minute theatre work, Sydney, 1989.
The Nuremberg Recital, 60 minute solo theatre work by Nigel Kellaway, Sydney & Perth, 1989.
Prescripts, 30 minute theatre work, Sydney 1990.
Woman in the Wall, 50 minutes solo theatre work by Clare Grant, Sydney & Auckland 1990.
Don Juan, 85 minute theatre work, Sydney 1991.
First and Last Warning, theatre work, Sydney, 1992.
 Techno/Dumb/Show, video work by John Gillies and The Sydney Front, 1991.
 Passion, theatre work, Sydney, 1993

References

Theatre companies in Australia
Culture of Sydney